This list of political action committees is organized by the nature of each particular U.S. PAC's work. OpenSecrets also maintains a comprehensive and continuously updated list of PACs on its website OpenSecrets.org.

Accounting
 American Institute of Certified Public Accountants PAC (AICPA PAC) – Durham, NC
 Deloitte & Touche Federal PAC – Washington, D.C.
 Ernst & Young PAC – Washington, D.C.
 KPMG Partners/Principals & Employees PAC – Washington, D.C.
 PricewaterhouseCoopers PAC – Washington, D.C.

Aerospace
 BAE Systems 
 Boeing 
 Lockheed Martin

Affiliated party

Democratic
 43 Alumni for Biden
 American Bridge 21st Century – Washington, D.C.
 Asian American Action Fund – Washington, D.C.
 Democracy for America – Burlington, VT
 DCCC – Washington, D.C.
 DSCC – Washington, D.C.
 Democratic Governors Association – Washington, D.C.
 Democrats for Education Reform – New York, NY
 Democratic Legislative Campaign Committee (DLCC) – Washington, D.C.
 Midwest Values PAC – Minneapolis, MN
 MoveOn PAC – Berkeley CA
 National Committee for an Effective Congress – Washington, D.C.
 People's Action – Washington, D.C.
 Re:Power – St. Paul, MN

Republican
 America First – Washington, D.C.
 America First Policies Action Fund – Arlington, VA
 Americans For Prosperity – Arlington, VA
 Citizens United Political Victory Fund – Washington, D.C.
 Club for Growth PAC – Washington DC
 Committee to Defend the President PAC – Washington, D.C.
 Congressional Leadership Fund PAC
 John Bolton PAC – Washington, D.C.
 Maggie's List – Tallahassee, FL
 Move America Forward – Melbourne, FL
 National Conservative Political Action Committee – McLean, VA
 Our Principles PAC – Alexandria, VA
 Republican Main Street Partnership PAC – Washington, D.C.
 Restore Our Future
 Susan B. Anthony List PAC – Washington, D.C.

Agribusiness
 American Veterinary Medical Association PAC – Washington, D.C.
 Dean Foods Company PAC – Dallas, TX
 Deere & Company PAC (John Deere PAC) – Moline, IL
 Farm Credit Council PAC – Washington, D.C.
 Koch Industries Action Fund – Wichita, KS
 Monsanto Company Citizenship Fund PAC – St. Louis, MO
 National Cattlemen's Beef Association PAC (NCBA-PAC) – Centennial, CO
 National Chicken Council PAC – Washington, D.C.
 Syngenta Corporation Employee PAC (Syngenta PAC) – Washington, D.C.
 Tyson Foods PAC (TYPAC) – Springdale, AR
 United Egg Producers PAC (Egg PAC) – Alpharetta, GA

Alcoholic beverages
 Anheuser-Busch Companies PAC – St. Louis, MO
 Brown-Forman Corporation Non Partisan Committee on Responsible Government – Louisville, KY
 Distilled Spirits Council of the United States PAC (DISCUS PAC) – Washington, D.C.
 National Beer Wholesalers Association PAC (NBWA PAC) – Alexandria, VA
 Wine and Spirits Wholesalers of America PAC (WSWA-PAC) – Washington, D.C.

Animals
Humane USA PAC – Washington, D.C.

Energy sector

Alternative energy
 American Wind Energy Association – Washington, D.C.
 Solar Energy Industries Association PAC – Washington, D.C.

Coal
 Arch Coal Political Action Committee (ARCHPAC) – St. Louis, MO.
 COALPAC, A Political Action Committee of the National Mining Association – Washington, D.C.
 Foundation Coal Corporation Political Action Committee – Linthicum Heights, MD
 Murray Energy PAC – Pepper Pike, OH
 Peabody Energy Corp. PAC (Peabody PAC) – St. Louis, MO

Electric
 American Committee for Rural Electrification (ACRE) National Rural Electric Cooperative – Arlington, VA
 The American Electric Power Committee for Responsible Government – Columbus, OH
 Dominion Resources PAC – Richmond, VA
 Duke Energy PAC – Richmond, VA
 Exelon PAC – Chicago, IL
 Florida Power & Light Employees PAC (FPL PAC) – Juno Beach, FL

Oil and gas
 American Gas Association PAC – Washington, D.C.
 Bass Brothers Energy PAC – Fort Worth, TX
 Chevron Corporation Employees PAC – San Ramon, CA
 ConocoPhillips Spirit PAC – Bartlesville, OK
 ExxonMobil PAC – Indianapolis, IN
 KochPAC – Washington, D.C.
 Valero Energy PAC – San Antonio, TX
 The Williams Companies PAC – Washington, D.C.

Environment
 League of Conservation Voters Action Fund – Washington, D.C.
 NextGen America PAC – San Francisco, CA
 Sierra Club Political Committee – San Francisco, CA

Ethnic
 Advancement Project PAC – Washington, D.C.
 Asian American Action Fund (pro-democratic Asian-American group) – Washington, D.C.
 Black Economic Alliance (African American business leaders) – Boston, MA
 Color of Change – Washington, D.C.
 Congressional Asian Pacific American Caucus Leadership PAC – Washington, D.C.
 Indian Americans for Freedom – Carol Stream, IL
 Latino Victory PAC – Washington, D.C.
 United Puerto Rican Political Action Committee – Lawrence, MA
 United We Dream PAC – Washington, D.C.
 US-Cuba Democracy PAC (pro-democratic Cuba group) – Hialeah, FL
 Voto Latino Super PAC – Washington, D.C.
 Asian Americans for Good Government (AAGG) PAC – Sacramento, CA

Finance, banking, credit, and insurance
 American Bankers Association PAC – Washington, D.C.
 American Express PAC (AXP PAC) – Washington, D.C.
 American Financial Services Association PAC (AFSA PAC) – Washington, D.C.
 Bank of America Federal PAC – Washington, D.C.
 Capital One Associates PAC – McLean, VA
 Cash America International PAC – Fort Worth, TX
 Citigroup, Inc. PAC – Washington, D.C.
 Credit Suisse Securities PAC – Washington, D.C.
 Cryptocurrency Alliance Super PAC – Washington, D.C.
 Deutsche Bank Americas Corp / Taunus Corporation PAC – Washington, D.C.
 Goldman Sachs PAC – Washington, D.C.
 HSBC North America Political Action Committee (H-PAC) – Mettawa, IL
 Independent Community Bankers of America PAC – Washington, D.C.
 Investment Company Institute PAC (ICI PAC) – Washington, D.C.
 MasterCard Inc. Employees PAC – Purchase, NY
 Morgan Stanley PAC – Washington, D.C.
 Sallie Mae PAC – Reston, VA
 Securities Industry and Financial Markets Association PAC (SIFMA PAC) – Washington, D.C.
 UBS Americas Fund for Better Government – Stamford, CT

Gun rights
 Gun Owners of America Political Victory Fund (GOA-PVF) – Springfield, VA
 National Rifle Association Political Victory Fund (NRA-PVF) – Arlington, VA

Insurance
 AFLAC PAC – Columbus, GA
 America’s Health Insurance Plans PAC (AHIP PAC) – Washington, D.C.
 Massachusetts Mutual Life Insurance PAC – Springfield, MA
 MetLife Employee Political Participation Fund – New York, NY
 National Association of Health Underwriters PAC (HUPAC) – Arlington, VA
 New York Life Insurance Company PAC – New York, NY
 USAA Employees PAC – San Antonio, TX

Ideology

Bipartisanship or nonpartisanship
 Bipartisan Policy Center Action

Conservative
 America First Policies Action Fund – Arlington, VA
 American Crossroads – Washington, D.C.
 Campaign for Working Families – Arlington, VA
 Citizens for Sanity
 Clearpath Solutions – Washington, D.C.
 Eagle Forum – Alton, IL
 Freedom Works – Alexandria, VA
 Freedom Partners – Alexandria, VA
 Right Side PAC
 TitoPac – Prince William Co., VA (Tito the Builder controlled)

Liberal
 American Bridge – Washington, D.C. (David Brock PAC)
 AllOfUs – Washington, D.C.
 America Votes – Washington, D.C.
 Democracy Alliance – Washington, D.C.
 Democracy Spring – Washington, D.C.
Democratic Socialists of America – Washington, D.C.
 Free Press Action – Washington, D.C.
 Fwd.us – Washington, D.C.
 Giffords Courage Action Fund – Washington, D.C.
 Issue One – Washington, D.C.
 Justice Democrats – Los Angeles, CA
 LCV PAC – Washington, D.C.
 Media Matters for America PAC – Washington, D.C.
 Onward Together – Washington, D.C.
 Our Revolution – Knoxville, TN
 People for the American Way – Washington, D.C.
 Progressive Caucus – Washington, D.C.
 Progressive Change Campaign Committee – Washington, D.C.
 Progressive Congress Action Fund – Washington, D.C.
 ProgressNow – Washington, D.C.
 Project Vote – Washington, D.C.
 Roosevelt Institute – New York, NY
 Southern Progress Fund – Fayetteville, AR
 Tax Policy Center – Washington, D.C.
 Ultraviolet – Washington, D.C.
 Working Families Party – Washington, D.C.

Other
 Credo Super PAC – Washington, D.C. (part of Working Assets group)
 Demand Progress – Washington, D.C.
 Demos Action PAC – New York, NY
 Emerge America -Washington, D.C.
 Liberty For All Political Action Committee – Austin, TX
 Lyndon LaRouche PAC (LaRouchePAC) – Leesburg, VA
 Our Principles PAC – Alexandria, VA
 United States India Political Action Committee – Washington, D.C.

Health care

Hospitals and care facilities
 American Healthcare Association PAC – Washington, D.C.
 American Hospital Association PAC – Washington, D.C.
 American Seniors Housing PAC – Washington, D.C.

Pharmaceutical and biotech
 Abbott Laboratories Employees PAC – Abbott Park, IL
 AmGen, Inc. PAC – Washington, D.C.
 Eli Lilly and Company PAC – Indianapolis, IN
 Genentech Inc Political Action Committee
 GlaxoSmithKline PAC – Residential Triangle Park, NC
 Johnson & Johnson PAC (JJPAC) – New Brunswick, NJ
 MerckPAC – Washington, D.C.
 Pfizer Inc. PAC (PfizerPAC) – New York, NY
 Pharmaceutical Research and Manufacturers of America Better Government Committee (PhRMA) – Washington, D.C.

Providers
 American Academy of Dermatology PAC (SkinPAC) – Washington, D.C.
 American Academy of Family Physicians PAC (FamMedPAC) – Washington, D.C.
 American Association of Orthopaedic Surgeons PAC (The Orthopaedic PAC) – Washington, D.C.
 American College of Pathology PAC (Path-PAC) – Milwaukee, WI
 American College of Radiology PAC (RadPAC) – Reston, VA
 American Dental Association PAC (ADPAC) – Washington, D.C.
 American Medical Association PAC (AmPAC) – Washington, D.C.
 American Optometric Association PAC (AOA PAC) – Alexandria, VA
 American Physical Therapy Association PAC (PT-PAC) – Alexandria, VA
 American Society of Anesthesiologists PAC (ASAPAC) – Park Ridge, IL
 Certified Registered Nurse Anesthetist PAC (CRNA-PAC) – Washington, D.C.
 National Emergency Medicine PAC (NEMPAC) – Irving, TX

Entertainment
 Clear Channel Communications PAC – San Antonio, TX
 Comcast Corporation PAC – Philadelphia, PA
 DirectTV Group Fund (DIRECTTV PAC) – Washington, D.C.
 National Association of Broadcasters PAC (NABPAC) – Washington, D.C.
 National Cable & Telecommunications Association PAC (NCTA PAC) – Washington, D.C.
 Time Warner Cable PAC – Washington, D.C.
 Walt Disney Productions Employees PAC – Washington, D.C.

Food and beverage
 American Beverage Association PAC – Washington, D.C.
 American Meat Institute PAC – Washington, D.C.
 Coca-Cola Company Non-Partisan Committee on Good Government – Atlanta, GA
 ConAgra Foods Good Government Committee – Omaha, NE
 Flowers Foods Industries PAC – Thomasville, GA
 Food Marketing Institute PAC (FOODPAC) (FOODPACE) – Arlington, VA
 General Mills PAC – Minneapolis, MN
 Kraft Foods PAC (KRAFTPAC) – Washington, D.C.
 McDonald's Corporation PAC – Oak Brook, IL
 National Restaurant Association PAC (NRA-PAC) – Washington, D.C.
 OSI Restaurant Partners PAC – Tampa, FL
 PepsiCo Concerned Citizens Fund – Purchase, NY
 Taco Political Action Committee (TACO PAC) – Shawnee Mission, KS
 Wendy's/Arby's Group PAC – Dublin, OH

Legal
 American Association for Justice – Washington, D.C.
 DLA Piper PAC – Washington, D.C.
 Greenberg Traurig PAC – Miami, FL
 Holland & Knight Committee for Effective Government – Washington, D.C.
 K&L Gates PAC – Washington, D.C.
 Patton Boggs PAC – Washington, D.C.
 Sonnenschein, Nath & Rosenthal PAC (Sonnenschein PAC) – Washington, D.C.

Manufacturing
 3M Company PAC – St. Paul, MN
 General Electric PAC (GEPAC) – Washington, D.C.
 Honeywell International PAC – Washington, D.C.
 Procter & Gamble Good Government Committee (P&G PAC) – Cincinnati, OH
 The Shaw Group PAC – Washington, D.C.

Marijuana
 Marijuana Policy Project – Washington, D.C.
 National Organization for the Reform of Marijuana Laws (NORML) – Washington, D.C.

Natural resources
 MINEPAC, A Political Action Committee of the National Mining Association – Washington, D.C.
 Weyerhaeuser Company PAC – Detroit, MI

Real estate
 National Apartment Association PAC (NAAPAC) – Arlington, VA
 National Association of Realtors PAC – Chicago, IL
 Real Estate Roundtable PAC (REALPAC) – Washington, D.C.

Retailers
 CVS Caremark Employees PAC – Washington, D.C.
 The Home Depot PAC – Washington, D.C.
 International Council of Shopping Centers PAC (ICSC PAC) – Washington, D.C.
 Target Citizens Political Forum – Minneapolis, MN
 Wal-Mart Stores PAC For Responsible Government – Washington, D.C.

Tobacco
 Altria PAC (ALTRIAPAC) – Washington, D.C.
 Lorillard Tobacco Company Public Affairs Committee – Greensboro, NC
 RJ Reynolds PAC – Winston-Salem, NC
 US Smokeless Tobacco Executives Administrators and Managers PAC – Washington, D.C.

Labor
 Carpenters Legislative Improvement Committee – Washington, D.C.
 IBEW PAC – Washington, D.C.
 International Union of Operating Engineers (IUOE) Political Education Committee – Washington, D.C.
 Laborers International Union of North America (LIUNA) PAC – Washington, D.C.
 Non-Partisan Political League of the International Association of Machinists and Aerospace Workers – Upper Marlboro, MD
 Service Employees International Union Committee on Political Education (SEIU COPE) – Washington, D.C.
 Transport Workers Union Political Contributions Committee – New York, NY
 Transportation Communications International Union Responsible Citizens Political League – Rockville, MD
 Working America PAC – Washington, D.C.

Leadership

House leadership
 Majority Whip James Clyburn – BRIDGE PAC – Washington, D.C.
 Majority Leader Steny Hoyer – AmeriPAC – Washington, D.C.
 Minority Leader Kevin McCarthy – Majority Committee PAC (MC PAC) – Bakersfield, CA
 Speaker of the House Nancy Pelosi – PAC to the Future – Washington, D.C.
 Minority Whip Steve Scalise – Eye of the Tiger Pac – Arlington, VA

House members
 Pete Aguilar – Progressive Majority PAC – CA-LUV PAC – Washington, D.C.
 Mo Brooks – Make Opportunity (MO) PAC – Huntsville, AL
 Katherine Clark – Fair Shot PAC – Boston, MA
 Debbie Dingell – Wolverine PAC – Washington, D.C.
 Tom Emmer – Electing Majority Making Effective Republicans – Anoka, MN
 Darrell Issa – Invest in a Safe & Secure America PAC (IssaPAC) – Vista, CA
 Pramila Jayapal – Medicare for All PAC – Seattle, WA
 Hakeem Jeffries – Jobs Education & Families First PAC – Washington, D.C.
 Patrick McHenry – Innovation PAC — Alexandria, VA
 Alexandria Ocasio-Cortez – Courage to Change PAC – Bronx, NY
 Frank Pallone – SHORE PAC – Long Branch, NJ
 Adam Schiff – Frontline USA – Los Angeles, CA
 Pete Sessions – People for Enterprise, Trade and Economic Growth – Alexandria, VA
 Elise Stefanik – E-PAC – Glen Falls, NY
 Bennie G. Thompson – Secure PAC – Bolton, MS
 Nydia M. Velazquez – Progress PAC – Gaithersburg, MD
 Debbie Wasserman Schultz – Democrats Win Seats – Weston, FL
 Liz Cheney – Cowboy PAC – Arlington, VA

Senate leadership
 Majority Whip Dick Durbin – Prairie PAC – Washington, D.C.
 Minority Leader Mitch McConnell – Bluegrass Committee – Alexandria, VA
 Majority Leader Chuck Schumer – Impact – New York, NY
 Minority Whip John Thune – Heartland Values PAC – Sioux Falls, SD

Senators
 Roy Blunt – Rely on Your Beliefs Fund (ROYB Fund) – Tacoma, WA
 Sherrod Brown – America Works PAC – Washington, D.C.
 John Cornyn – Alamo PAC – Austin, TX
 Dianne Feinstein – Fund for the Majority – Burbank, CA
 Chuck Grassley – Hawkeye PAC – Des Moines, IA
 Amy Klobuchar – Follow the North Star Fund – Minneapolis, MN
 Patrick Leahy – Green Mountain PAC – Montpelier, VT
 Robert Menendez – New Millennium PAC – Union City, NJ
 Rand Paul – Human Action – Tucson, AZ
 Mitt Romney – Free & Strong America PAC – Lexington, MA
 Chris Van Hollen – Victory Now PAC – Kensington, MD
 Mark R. Warner – Forward Together PAC – Alexandria, VA

State and local officials
 Mitch Daniels – Aiming Higher PAC
 Rahm Emanuel – Our Common Values PAC – Chicago, IL

Former elected and public officials
 Max Baucus – Glacier PAC – Missoula, MT
 Robert F. Benett – SNOWPAC – Salt Lake City, UT
 John Boehner – The Freedom Project – Washington, D.C.
 Barbara Boxer – PAC for a Change – Los Angeles, CA
 Hillary Clinton – HILLPAC – Washington, D.C.
 Joe Crowley – Jobs, Opportunity & Education PAC (JoePAC) – Elmhurst, NY
 Kent Conrad – DAKPAC – Washington, D.C.
 John Conyers – America Forward PAC – Washington, D.C.
 Jim DeMint – Senate Conservatives Fund – Alexandria, VA
 Chris Dodd – Citizens for Hope, Responsibility, Independence & Service (Chris PAC) – Washington, D.C.
 Byron Dorgan – Great Plains Leadership Fund – Washington, D.C.
 Bob Filner – San Diego PAC – San Diego, CA
 Newt Gingrich – American Solutions PAC – Alexandria, VA
 Nikki Haley – Stand for America – Washington, DC
 Tom Harkin – To Organize a Majority PAC (TomPAC) – Des Moines, IA
 Mike Huckabee – Huck PAC – Little Rock, AR
 Jon Huntsman – HorizonPac/H-PAC – Washington, D.C.
 Daniel Inouye – DANPAC – Honolulu, HI
 John Kerry – Campaign for Our Country – Washington, D.C.
 Minority Whip John Kyl – Senate Majority Fund – Washington, D.C.
 Mary Landrieu – Jazz PAC – Washington, D.C.
 Joe Lieberman – Reuniting Our Country – Washington, D.C.
 Blanche Lincoln – Leadership in the New Century (LINC PAC) – Little Rock, AR
 John McCain – Country First PAC – Alexandria, VA
 David R. Obey – Committee for a Progressive Congress – Washington, D.C.
 Sarah Palin – SarahPAC – Arlington, VA
 Ron Paul – Liberty PAC – Lake Jackson, TX
 Mark Pryor – Priority PAC – Little Rock, AR
 Tim Pawlenty – Freedom First – St. Paul, MN
 Nick Rahall – 3T PAC – Beckley, WV
 Charles Rangel – National Leadership PAC – New York, NY
 Rick Santorum – America's Foundation PAC – Downingtown, PA
 Ike Skelton – The Show-Me Fund – Blue Bell, PA
 John M. Spratt, Jr. – Palmetto PAC – Bethesda, MD
 Donald Trump – Save America – Arlington, VA
 Henry Waxman – LA PAC – Los Angeles, CA

Religious/Ethnic
 Republican Jewish Coalition – Washington, D.C.

Social issues

LGBT issues
 Equality PAC – Washington, D.C.
 Gay & Lesbian Victory Fund – Washington, D.C.
 Human Rights Campaign PAC – Washington, D.C.
 LPAC – Washington, D.C.
 Pride PAC – San Francisco, CA

Abortion

Pro-abortion rights
 EMILY's List – Washington, D.C.
 NARAL Pro-Choice America PAC – Washington, D.C.
 Planned Parenthood Action Fund – New York, NY
 The Wish List – Alexandria, VA
 Republicans for Choice

Anti-abortion rights
Susan B. Anthony Pro-Life America
American Life League

Transportation

Air
 Aircraft Owners and Pilots Association PAC – Frederick, MD
 American Airlines PAC – Washington, D.C.
 Continental Airlines Employee Fund for a Better America – Houston, TX
 Delta Air Lines PAC – Washington, D.C.
 Federal Express PAC (FEDEXPAC) – Memphis, TN
 United Parcel Service PAC (UPSPAC) – Atlanta, GA

Freight rail
 American Short Line and Regional Railroad Association PAC (ASLRRA PAC) – Washington, D.C.
 Association of American Railroads PAC (RAILPAC) – Washington, D.C.
 Burlington Northern Santa Fe Corporation RailPac (BNSF RailPAC) – Fort Worth, TX
 CSX Corporation Good Government Fund – Washington, D.C.
 Norfolk Southern Corporation Good Government Fund – Norfolk, VA
 Union Pacific Corporation Fund for a Better Government – Washington, D.C.

Road
 National Limousine Association PAC (NLA) – Marlton, NJ

Construction
 American Road and Transportation Builders Association PAC (ARTBA PAC) – Washington, D.C.

Foreign affairs
 Hudson Institute PAC – New York, NY
 J Street PAC – Washington, D.C.
 NORPAC – Englewood Cliffs, NJ
 Truman Project PAC – Washington, D.C.
 VoteVets.org – Washington, D.C.

References

External links
 Federal Elections Commission's PACs page
 OpenSecrets
 PoliticalMoneyLine